Janam Janam Ke Saath is a 2007 Indian Bhojpuri-language romantic drama film directed by Aslam Shekh. It stars Manoj Tiwari, Nagma, Bhagyashree and Ravi Kishan.

Cast
 Manoj Tiwari
 Bhagyashree 
 Ravi Kishan
 Nagma
 Shakti Kapoor
 Mohan Joshi
 Kiran Kumar
 Saadhika Randhawa (Guest Appearance)

References

2007 films
T-Series (company) films
2000s Bhojpuri-language films